The Great American Conference men's basketball tournament is the annual conference basketball championship tournament for the Great American Conference.

The tournament has been held annually since 2012, one year after the conference was initially founded. It is a single-elimination tournament and seeding is based on regular season records.

The winner, declared conference champion, receives the conference's automatic bid to the NCAA Division II men's basketball tournament.

Results

Championship records

 Northwestern Oklahoma State has not yet reached the tournament final

See also
NCAA Division II men's basketball tournament
Great American Conference women's basketball tournament

References

NCAA Division II men's basketball conference tournaments
Basketball Tournament, Men's
Recurring sporting events established in 2012